FC Avtomobilist Yuzhno-Sakhalinsk was a Russian football team from Yuzhno-Sakhalinsk. It played professionally for one season - in the Russian Second League, Zone East in 1994.

External links
  Team history at KLISF

Association football clubs established in 1993
Association football clubs disestablished in 1995
Defunct football clubs in Russia
Sport in Yuzhno-Sakhalinsk
1993 establishments in Russia
1995 disestablishments in Russia